Nawab Sir  Muhammad Khan-i-Zaman Khan Tanoli   
  also known as Khan-i-Zaman Khan, was the ruling Nawab of the princely state of Amb from 1907 until his death in 1936 in his region Darband become a biggest trade market of India. 

The son of Nawab Muhammad Akram Khan, whom he succeeded in 1907, the Nawab helped the British in carrying out several of the later Black Mountain expeditions to Kala Dhaka/Tor Ghar. In 1926 he sent a force which fought with the Wali of Swat at Chamla.

He also make a cash contribute of 1 lac in order to built Islamia College University in visionary of Shahibzada Abdul Qayyum Khan.
He send food, Artillery, goods and reliance support to ottoman Khalil Pasha but due to alliance with British raj as a indian princely state he was unable to take part or alliance with British or as well as Ottoman he remains himself and his army to make quietness in Fall of Bagdad (1917). Nawab had a good relationship with Ottoman Sultan and the extreme support to ottoman empire at a very difficult quite time was very reliable. As well as being a knight commander of the Order of the Indian Empire, the Nawab held the rank of Honorary Major in the Indian Army. 

From his time onwards, the title of 'Nawab' was used in perpetuity by him and his descendants.

References

Hindkowan people
Nawabs of Amb
1936 deaths
Deaths from syphilis
1874 births